Walnut Creek is a stream in Polk County the Ozarks of southwest Missouri. It is a tributary of the Little Sac River.

The stream source is just southwest of the community of Karlin south of Bolivar. The stream flows southwest and west to its junction with the Little Sac about one mile south of Stockton Lake.

Walnut Creek was so named due to the abundant walnut timber in the area.

See also
List of rivers of Missouri

References

Rivers of Polk County, Missouri
Rivers of Missouri